Sir Hugh Arthur Henry Cholmeley, 3rd Baronet, DL, JP (18 October 1839 – 14 February 1904) was a British soldier, landowner, and Liberal politician.

Career
Cholmeley was the eldest son of Sir Montague John Cholmeley, 2nd Baronet and Lady Georgiana Beauclerk, fifth daughter of the 8th Duke of St Albans. Cholmeley was educated at Harrow School. He then served in the Grenadier Guards and reached the rank of Captain. In January 1868, he succeeded his father as baronet.

At a parliamentary by-election on 27 April 1868 in Grantham, Cholmeley stood unsuccessfully for the Liberals, beaten by Edmund Turnor, but at the general election later in the same year he was elected as a Member of Parliament unopposed, with Turnor choosing to stand elsewhere. He held one of the borough’s two seats until the elections of 1880, when he did not stand again. He became High Sheriff of Lincolnshire in 1885 and was a Justice of Peace and deputy lieutenant for the same county. At the 1889 Kesteven County Council election he was elected to the newly-created Kesteven County Council as the member for Ponton.

Personal life
On 12 August 1874, he married Edith Sophia Rowley, daughter of Sir Charles Rowley, 4th Baronet. They had four daughters and a son, Montague, who succeeded to the baronetcy.

Cholmeley is commemorated at St Andrew and St Mary's Church, Stoke Rochford, by a stained glass window erected by his widow and children. Further windows in the church were erected, one to his son Montague, the other to Lady Cholmeley.

References

External links

1839 births
1904 deaths
Baronets in the Baronetage of the United Kingdom
Deputy Lieutenants of Lincolnshire
Grenadier Guards officers
Members of the Parliament of the United Kingdom for English constituencies
People educated at Harrow School
UK MPs 1868–1874
UK MPs 1874–1880
High Sheriffs of Lincolnshire
Hugh
Members of Kesteven County Council
Cholmeley baronets